Jamie Chandler  (born 24 March 1989) is an English professional footballer who plays as a midfielder for Spennymoor Town.

Career
Chandler was born in South Shields and was brought up in Boldon. He began his career at Sunderland, and while with that club was capped several times by England at levels from under-16 to under-19. He signed his first professional contract in 2007, after recovering from a broken leg.

He was loaned to Football League Two club Darlington in August 2009 to gain first-team experience, and made his debut in the Football League on 8 August against Aldershot Town coming on as a substitute. He made his first start two days later against Leeds United in the League Cup. He returned to Sunderland in November 2009.

At the end of the 2009–10 season, Chandler's contract with Sunderland expired. He signed a two-year deal with Darlington, recently relegated to the Conference Premier. He scored his first goal for his new side against Forest Green Rovers on 11 September 2010. Chandler was named man of the match as Darlington beat Mansfield Town in the 2011 FA Trophy Final, and also won the club's Young Player of the Year award.

On 13 January 2012, Chandler signed for Gateshead, along with Liam Hatch, for a nominal fee. He made his debut the following day, scoring in a 2–2 draw against Braintree Town in the FA Trophy. He agreed a new one-year contract with the club in May 2012 to cover the 2012–13 season. On 6 July 2012, Chandler was named vice-captain at Gateshead following the departure of Kris Gate. On 28 March 2016, it was announced that Chandler would leave Gateshead at the end of the 2015–16 season.

On 30 June 2016, Jamie joined National League North side Spennymoor Town on a free transfer. He scored his first goal for the club during the 2017–2018 season, and has been a regular starter for the club since 2017.

Career statistics

References

External links

Living people
1989 births
Footballers from South Shields
English footballers
England youth international footballers
Association football midfielders
Sunderland A.F.C. players
Darlington F.C. players
Gateshead F.C. players
Spennymoor Town F.C. players
English Football League players
National League (English football) players
Northern Premier League players